{{Speciesbox 
| image = Willowsia nigromaculata.jpg
| image_caption = Found in a bathtub in Michigan
| genus = Willowsia
| species = nigromaculata
| authority = (Lubbock, 1873) <ref>{{ITIS |id=99769 |taxon=Willowsia nigromaculata  (Lubbock, 1873) |accessdate=November 17, 2010}}</ref>
| synonyms = Seira nigromaculata Lubbock, 1873Willowsia mimica Harvey, 1894
}}Willowsia nigromaculata'' is a member of the family Entomobryidae. It has a metallic iridescent body and is covered in translucent scales. It is often found indoors in places such as houses, garages and greenhouses.

References

Collembola
Animals described in 1873
Arthropods of North America